Elections to Dorset County Council were held on Thursday, 5 May 1977.  The whole council of 91 members was up for election and the result was that the Conservatives comfortably retained their control, winning seventy-nine seats, a gain of 19, of which nine were from Labour and seven from the Liberals. Labour, the Liberals, and the Independents ended with only four county councillors each.

Results

|}

Election result by division

Bournemouth (25 seats)

Christchurch (6 seats)

East Dorset (9 seats)

North Dorset (7 seats)

Poole (17 seats)

Purbeck (6 seats)

West Dorset (12 seats)

Weymouth and Portland (9 seats)

References

1977
Dorset
20th century in Dorset